Kopperl High School, also known as Kopperl School, is a public high school located in Kopperl, Texas (United States). It is the sole high school in the Kopperl Independent School District and is classified as a 1A school by the UIL. In 2015, the school was rated "Met Standard" by the Texas Education Agency.

Athletics
The Kopperl Eagles compete in the following sports:

Baseball
Basketball
6-Man Football
Golf
Softball
Tennis
Track and Field
Volleyball

References

External links
 Official website

Schools in Bosque County, Texas
Public high schools in Texas